This is a list of Canadian radio personalities.

A
Charles Adler
Jerry Agar
Ismaila Alfa
Tom Allen
Steve Anthony
Paul Arcand
Peter Armstrong
André Arthur

B
Brent Bambury
Carl Banas
Andy Barrie
Marie-France Bazzo
Stephanie Beard
Jaymz Bee
Paul Bellini
Ralph Benmergui
Avril Benoît
Dorothée Berryman
Dennis Beyak
Ferdinand Biondi
DJ Blitz
Dean Blundell
Dave Bookman
Joe Bowen
Dave Brindle
Craig Bromell
Harry Brown
Jim Brown
Robin Brown
Barbara Budd

C
Stan Carew
Bill Carroll
Maggie Cassella
Rita Celli
Dave Chalk
Christiane Charette
Piya Chattopadhyay
Wei Chen
Lisa Christiansen
Christy Clark
Saroja Coelho
Leon Cole
Carla Collins
Scruff Connors
Michael Coren
Gavin Crawford
Alan Cross

D
Erin Davis
Mark Day (actor)
Gill Deacon
Marc Denis
Marilyn Denis
Bernard Derome
John Derringer
Jeff Douglas
Raina Douris
Darren Dreger
Dan Dunleavy
Dan Duran
Josie Dye
Jesse Dylan

E
Mark Elliot
Michael Enright
Mary Jo Eustace

F
Jane Farrow
Laura Fernandez
Mary Lou Finlay
Robert Fisher
Martina Fitzgerald
Andy Frost
Barbara Frum

G
Vicki Gabereau
Matt Galloway
Lana Gay
Jian Ghomeshi
Clyde Gilmour
"Humble Howard" Glassman
Dale Goldhawk
Jurgen Gothe
Jane Gray
Lowell Green
Lorne Greene
David Grierson
Peter Gzowski

H
Marie-Lynn Hammond
Keith Hampshire
Adrian Harewood
Tom Harrington
Jane Hawtin
Foster Hewitt
Maureen Holloway
Chris Howden

I
Mary Ito
Steve Ivings

J
Don Jackson
Doug James
Stu Jeffries
Molly Johnson
Taborah Johnson

K
Linda Kash
Paul Kennedy
Vish Khanna
Cory Kimm
Wab Kinew
Leora Kornfeld
Ken Kostick
Andrew Krystal

L
Anne Lagacé Dowson
Grant Lawrence
Sook-Yin Lee
Marilyn Lightstone

M
Bob Mackowycz
Pierre Mailloux
Rafe Mair
Alan Maitland
John Majhor
Katie Malloch
Jeff Marek
MC Mario
David Marsden
Pat Marsden
Bob McAdorey
Stuart McLean
Bernie McNamee
Casey Mecija
Kim Mitchell
Alain Montpetit
John Moore
Terry Moore
Terry David Mulligan
Rex Murphy

N
Alan Neal
Julie Nesrallah
Craig Norris

O
Carol Off

P
Candy Palmater
Amanda Parris
Fred Patterson
Lise Payette
Deb Pearce
Holger Petersen
Kathleen Petty
Geoff Pevere
Cameron Phillips
Catherine Pogonat
Ross Porter
Tom Power
Shaun Proulx
Amanda Putz

Q

R
Jim Ralph
Sean Rameswaram
Jim Richards
Bill Richardson
Erika Ritter
Leslie Roberts
Tom Roberts
Ken Rockburn
Shelagh Rogers
Richard Ryder

S
Bernard St-Laurent
Simi Sara
Patti Schmidt
Dave Seglins
Shad
Tetsuro Shigematsu
Peter Shurman
Gordon Sinclair
Lister Sinclair
Richard Z. Sirois
Alison Smith
Shelley Solmes
Martin Streek
George Stroumboulopoulos
Kevin Sylvester

T
Tim Tamashiro
Jowi Taylor
Rich Terfry
Angeline Tetteh-Wayoe
John Tory
Anna Maria Tremonti

U

V
Gene Valaitis

W
Bill Walker
Bill Watters
Odario Williams
David Wisdom
Ted Woloshyn
Cajjmere Wray

X

Y
Nora Young

Z

Radio personalities